Lancaster Soft Crèmes are a caramel or milk-based candy produced by The Hershey Company. First launched in China in 2013 as a "milk candy", it was introduced into the United States as a caramel candy the next year. The candy was Hershey's first entirely new product in 30 years.

History 
The crèmes were inspired by similar caramels produced by the first candy company founded by Milton S. Hershey—the Lancaster Caramel Company. Built upon the reputation of Lancaster Caramel, Hershey eventually was able to found The Hershey Company. The new company initially supplied the chocolate needed to coat the caramels produced at Lancaster before the more famous Hershey bar was developed.

Lancaster Soft Crèmes were the first brand to be introduced in 30 years by Hershey that was neither an expansion of an existing brand, nor an acquisition from another company. It was also the first to be launched outside of the United States, with the roll out first in Wuhan, Hangzhou and Chengdu in May 2013; the U.S. launch occurred in February 2014.

Rather than using a test market, the two versions of the caramels were developed separately to cater to the different tastes of consumers in China and the U.S. The Lancaster product in China is a more traditional milk-based candy popular in Asia, while the U.S. product is caramel-based with a more "sweet and salty" taste. Lancaster Soft Crèmes are produced in Canada for the U.S., and a local confectionery in Hunan is used for the Chinese market.

Varieties 

China:
 Milk
 Caramel
 Strawberry

United States:
 Butterscotch & Caramel
 Caramel
 Coffee & Caramel
 Sea Salt & Caramel
 Vanilla & Caramel
 Vanilla & Raspberry

References

Products introduced in 2013
The Hershey Company brands